Pharmacy is the debut studio album by Swedish electronic music duo Galantis, released on 8 June 2015. The album features six singles ("Runaway (U & I)", "You", "Peanut Butter Jelly", "Gold Dust", "In My Head" and "Louder, Harder, Better").

Artwork
Overall, four "Seafoxes" are included in the album artwork. The cover features a unique Seafox, only seen on the album artwork.

The booklet features a Seafox also used for the "You" single artwork, and also appears on the cover of the Galantis EP.

The inside panel of the digipak features a Seafox used for the "Peanut Butter Jelly" single artwork, and also the YouTube audio for "Louder, Harder, Better".

Behind the CD tray is a Seafox also used to front the "Gold Dust" single artwork, and also appears on the cover of the Galantis EP.

The booklet included also includes a picture of Galantis themselves (Christian "Bloodshy" Karlsson, Linus "Style of Eye" Eklöw), standing back to back.

Singles
The first single "You" was originally on their self-titled EP and currently has over eight million plays on Spotify. However, it was not intended to promote Pharmacy, making "Runaway (U & I)" the album's first official single. 
Galantis released the single "Gold Dust" on 19 February 2015 as the album second official single. It reached number one on Hype Machine's Popular Chart.
"Peanut Butter Jelly" was later released as the third official single on the pre-release of the album on 20 April 2015. "In My Head" was released as the album's fourth official single on 30 October 2015 and "Louder, Harder, Better" was released as the album's fifth official single on 12 February 2016.

Critical reception
John Cameron from We Got This Covered gave Pharmacy 3.5/5 stars stating, "Galantis may have set our expectations a little too high with their 2014 releases" (referencing "Runaway (U & I)", 'You" and "Smile"), and added that although the album's production values were good, "most of the songs seem to lack originality". Cameron also mentioned that the tracks on Pharmacy are "not poorly done by any means – it's just that very few of the new ones are all that memorable." A more positive review came from Lucas Sachs from Your EDM, as he gave the album a "respectable 8.5/10" pointing out tracks "Louder, Harder, Better" and "Firebird" as his "two new songs from this album that stick out to me due to their excellence in production and writing." He wrote that "Louder, Harder, Better" encompasses all that Galantis stands for, and that "Firebird" was his favorite track on the album due to the nostalgic feeling in the lyrics and the added reverb on the word "bird".

Tour
On 21 May 2015 Galantis began their summer festival tour in support of Pharmacy, which ended on 6 August 2015. There were 22 dates on the tour in total. There were performances in multiple continents including Europe and North America.

Track listing

Notes
 Track 1 features vocals from Jennifer Decilveo and Stephen Simmonds.
 Tracks 2, 7 and 12 feature vocals solely from Vincent Pontare.
 Track 3 features Vincent Pontare and Jennifer Decilveo.
 Track 4 features Cathy Dennis and Julia Karlsson.
 Track 5 features from Nicole "Coco" Morier and Vincent Pontare.
 Track 6 features from Cathy Dennis.
 Track 8 features vocals from Blackbear and Vincent Pontare.
 Track 9 samples the 1974 song "Kiss My Love Goodbye" by Bettye Swann. 
 Track 9 features vocals from Christian Karlsson and Linus Eklöw (both members of Galantis) and Martina Sorbara from Dragonette.
 Track 10 features vocals from Dragonette and Cathy Dennis.
 Track 11 features vocals from Leon Jean-Marie.
 Track 13 features vocals from Andrew Jackson.

Charts

Weekly charts

Year-end charts

Certifications

References

2015 debut albums
Galantis albums
Atlantic Records albums